Peter Stephen Maurice Selby (born 7 December 1941) is a retired British Anglican bishop. He was the Church of England Bishop of Worcester from 1997 until he retired at the end of September 2007.

Education
He was educated at St John's College, Oxford, and at Episcopal Theological School in Cambridge, Massachusetts, taking the Oxford degree of MA(Oxon) (1967, BA 1964) and the Cambridge, Massachusetts, degree of BD (1966). He was awarded a PhD degree from King's College London in 1975.

Ecclesiastical career
He was Assistant Curate, Queensbury, 1966–68; Associate Director of Training, Southwark, 1969–73; Assistant Curate, Limpsfield with Titsey, 1969–77; Vice-Principal, Southwark Ordination Course, 1970–72; Assistant Missioner, Diocese of Southwark, 1973–77; Canon Residentiary, Newcastle Cathedral, 1977–84; Diocesan Missioner, Diocese of Newcastle, 1977–84; Bishop of Kingston 1984–1992 (an area bishop from 1991); William Leech Professorial Fellow in Applied Christian Theology, University of Durham, 1992–1997; Honorary assistant bishop in the dioceses of Durham and of Newcastle, 1992–97; Visitor General, Community of Sisters of the Church, 1991–2001, a Member of the Doctrine Commission, 1991–2003, and President of the Modern Churchpeople's Union, 1990–96 and of the Society for Study of Theology, 2003–04; Bishop to HM Prisons, 2001–2007 and from January 2008 became the President of the National Council for Independent Monitoring Boards for prisons. He was appointed Bishop of Worcester in 1997.

The Charles Raven affair
Selby had disagreed with the 1998 Lambeth agreement that bishops would not ordain homosexuals as clergy. In 2002 he was asked to affirm this by one of his own clergymen, Charles Raven, the vicar of St. John's Church, Kidderminster. Selby refused to do so, and was therefore asked not to come to the church to confirm people, since there would be no agreement as to what the faith being confirmed was. As Raven's licence was not renewable he had to leave his post, and founded a breakaway congregation, taking with him about half the members of the church he had served.  The story made the national press several times.

Retirement
Selby and John Saxbee were appointed Episcopal Patrons of the international No Anglican Covenant Coalition in July 2011. In a joint letter to the Church Times, Saxbee and Selby warned that "this is a time to hold fast to Anglicanism’s inherited culture of inclusion and respectful debate which is our way of dealing with difference rather than require assent to procedures and words that have already shown themselves to be divisive."

Since retirement Selby served for five years as President of the National Council for Independent Monitoring Boards, the Boards monitoring fairness and respect for those in custody. He retired from that post in 2013, and has since been an interim co-director of St Paul's Institute, the Cathedral's agency that dialogues with the financial sector in the City of London.

On 11 February 2017, Selby was one of fourteen retired bishops to sign an open letter to the then-serving bishops of the Church of England. In an unprecedented move, they expressed their opposition to the House of Bishops' report to General Synod on sexuality, which recommended no change to the Church's canons or practises around sexuality. By 13 February, a serving bishop (Alan Wilson, Bishop of Buckingham) and nine further retired bishops had added their signatures; on 15 February, the report was rejected by synod.

Styles
 The Reverend Peter Selby (1966–1975)
 The Reverend Doctor Peter Selby (1975–1977)
 The Reverend Canon Doctor Peter Selby (1977–1984)
 The Right Reverend Doctor Peter Selby (1984–1992; 1997–present)
 The Right Reverend Professor Peter Selby (1992–1997)

References

Bibliography
 'Grace and Mortgage: Language of Faith and the Debt of the World', Peter Selby, Publ. Darton, Longman & Todd Ltd (1997) 
 'Rescue: Jesus and Salvation Today', Peter Selby, Publ. Society for Promoting Christian Knowledge (1996)

External links
 Diocesan web page with photograph
 No Anglican Covenant website

Bishops of Worcester
Bishops to HM Prisons
Bishops of Kingston
Non-diocesan Anglican bishops
20th-century Church of England bishops
21st-century Church of England bishops
English religious writers
1941 births
Living people
Alumni of St John's College, Oxford
Alumni of King's College London
Academics of Durham University
English male non-fiction writers